Cathal Scally (born 1994 in Clonkill, County Westmeath, Ireland) is an Irish sportsperson.  He plays hurling with his local club Clonkill and has been a member of the Westmeath senior inter-county team since 2011.

References

1994 births
Living people
Clonkill hurlers
Westmeath inter-county hurlers
Hurling goalkeepers